Cheb Airport (in Czech Letiště Cheb) (ICAO: LKCB) is the oldest in the Czech Republic. It is located 4.5 km from city of Cheb (in German Eger).

The airport was built during the World War I to serve needs of the Austro-Hungarian Army. In 1918, when Czechoslovakia was created, it was the only working airport in the country. The first airplanes for the newly formed Czechoslovakian Army were obtained from the airport. Later, the army set up a pilot training center next to the airport.

During World War II Germans built a large aircraft factory (Eger Flugzeugwerke GmbH) next to the airport. The factory repaired and produced parts Heinkel He 111, Heinkel He 177, Heinkel He 219 and Messerschmitt Me 262. American bombing at the end of war destroyed the airport and the factory, with one of the military airfield's circular concrete dispersal areas at its periphery being the "final resting place" for the He 177 V101 four-engined prototype heavy bomber, apparently wrecked there at the war's close.

In the airport is located VOR/DME station (call sign OKG).

Airport was reopened 19 August 2010 as public domestic aerodrome and operational availability is VFR DAY. 
The original concrete runway 06/24 is repaired in the length of 1000 m and width of 18 m. The grass runway 05/23 is 1000 m long and 25 m wide.

Literature
 Luděk Matějíček: Chebská křídla (Wings from Cheb), 2006, . Extended second edition published in 2013.

References

External links
 Airport Cheb
 VFR Manual LKCB
 Photo gallery of the airport and military barracks before the war (descriptions in Czech)
 Photo gallery of the destroyed airport in May 1945 (descriptions in Czech)

Cheb
Airport